"Scattered" is a song by the British rock band The Kinks. Written by Ray Davies, "Scattered" appeared as the sixteenth track from their album Phobia, and was the band's final original single (only to be followed by reissues of "You Really Got Me" and "Waterloo Sunset".)

Background

On its appearance on Phobia, "Scattered" is dedicated to Annie Florence Davies (Ray Davies' mother) and Carol Bryans (a friend of Davies's.) Both died due to cancer.

Ray Davies claimed that "Scattered" took ten years to write. Author Thomas Kitts believes that the song was initially inspired by Ray Davies broken relationship with Pretenders leader Chrissie Hynde.

Release

"Scattered" was first released in Europe as a single in 1993, 21 days prior to the release of Phobia. The song was then released on Phobia as the closing track (except for Japan and the UK, where "Did Ya" was added as a bonus track, making "Scattered" the penultimate track.) After the release of the song "Only a Dream" as the debut British single from Phobia, "Scattered" was planned to be the follow-up to "Only a Dream". However, due to the under-performance of "Only a Dream", the "Scattered" single was cancelled, despite advertising for the single being released.  However, "Scattered" eventually saw release as a single in Britain in small amounts in the collectors' market during 1993. One year later, Columbia Records dropped The Kinks. It did not chart.

Reception

Although it was unsuccessful as a single, "Scattered" has been praised as one of the best songs on Phobia from critics. Thomas Kitts, author of Ray Davies: Not Like Everybody Else, said that it was "one of [Davies's] most complex lyrics and one of [Davies's] best songs of the 1990s." Rovi Staff of AllMusic cited "Scattered" as a highlight from Phobia.

References

The Kinks songs
1993 singles
Songs written by Ray Davies
Song recordings produced by Ray Davies
1993 songs
MCA Records singles